Little Forest is a South Korean television entertainment program broadcast by SBS every Monday and Tuesday from 12 August to 7 October 2019. The program starred Lee Seo-jin, Lee Seung-gi, Park Na-rae and Jung So-min.

Overview
The program is a 16-episode series program to "Caring for Kids in the Nature" for children who have no place to play with and is a healing variety program designed as a home kids garden development project for children.
The kids will spend 2 days and 1 night with the cast, away from their parents for the first time.

Lee Seung-gi and Jung So-min are certified child psychology counselor and Lee Seo-jin is a certified chef who went through training for a cooking course to cater for young kids. Park Na-rae also took a cooking course. Lee Seung-gi has some experience in woodworking and utilizes the wood workshop to build fun activities for the kids.

Location and facility
The filming location is at Jjigbaggol, Inje, Gangwon Province with the land area of about 33,000m2. The place consists of a big open field with an open concept kitchen, front yard, workshop, living quarters (for kids and cast), garden, small animal farm and Pine forest.

Addition of facilities
Suspension bridge — Seung-gi, Seo-jin and So-min added a suspension bridge course in the Pine forest for the kids to play with. Further improvement is made in episode 3 to adapt to younger kids.
Treehouse — Seung-gi designed and built a treehouse, in the Pine forest, under the supervision of a teacher in episode 5. Seo-jin and the workers help in the construction of the treehouse.

Airtime

Cast

Main Cast

Kids
Listing of the kids are in the sequence of arrival at the Little Forest.

Ratings

Awards and nominations

References

External links
  

Seoul Broadcasting System original programming
2019 South Korean television series debuts
2019 South Korean television series endings
Korean-language television shows
South Korean variety television shows
South Korean reality television series